Ralph Vaughan Williams's Symphony No. 3, published as Pastoral Symphony and not numbered until later, was completed in 1922. Vaughan Williams's initial inspiration to write this symphony came during World War I after hearing a bugler practising and accidentally playing an interval of a seventh instead of an octave; this ultimately led to the trumpet cadenza in the second movement.

The work is among the least performed of Vaughan Williams's symphonies, but it has gained the reputation of being a subtly beautiful elegy for the dead of World War I and a meditation on the sounds of peace. Like many of the composer's works, the Pastoral Symphony is not programmatic, but its spirit is evocative. None of the movements are particularly fast or upbeat (the composer himself described it as "four movements, all of them slow"), but there are isolated extroverted sections.

It was first performed in London on 16 January 1922 with Adrian Boult conducting.

The symphony was dismissed by Constant Lambert, who wrote that its "creation of a particular type of grey, reflective, English-landscape mood has outweighed the exigencies of symphonic form". Peter Warlock's often-quoted comment that "it is all just a little too much like a cow looking over a gate" was in fact a comment on Vaughan Williams's style in general, and was not aimed specifically at the Pastoral Symphony, which he on the contrary described as "a truly splendid work" and "the best English orchestral music of this century". Vaughan Williams emphasized, however, that the work is "not really Lambkins frisking at all as most people take for granted" (i.e., English pastoral scenery); its reference is to the fields of France during World War I, where the composer served in the Royal Army Medical Corps.

Structure
The symphony is in four movements:
 Molto moderato 
 Lento moderato – Moderato maestoso – the slow movement opens with an F major natural-horn solo above an F minor chord, a theme that is developed by a solo cello.Just as in the first movement, the ideas flow gently from one to the next, ultimately leading to the trumpet cadenza. Here, the instrument is in effect a natural trumpet (a trumpet without valves) in E, since the player is instructed not to use the valves. As a result, the seventh harmonic is played instead of the ordinary minor seventh, and so it sounds slightly out-of-tune with its nearest equivalent in 12-tone equal temperament.The entire cadenza is played over a pedal note in the strings. The cadenza material later reappears on the natural horn in F, gently accompanied by a returning theme now played on the cor anglais. The movement ends with a quiet chord in the violins' high register.
 Moderato pesante – Vaughan Williams described this movement, the symphony's scherzo function, as a "slow dance".The trio, introduced by the brass section, has a quicker, brighter quality but retains some of the heaviness of the earlier music.After the shortened return of the main material there is a coda with some fugal writing. This is the only time truly fast music appears in the symphony. A theme from the main section of the movement creeps into this fugue. The movement ends in a major chord.
 Lento – the final movement returns to the contemplative manner of the first two movements, and functions as a summing-up and coda to the rest of the symphony. It begins with a pentatonic passage for a wordless soprano voice (silent until this point), sung over a soft drumroll.The orchestra then begins an elegiac rhapsody. The high point of the symphony comes when the violins all state the opening soprano melody appassionato. At the very end of the symphony, the soprano returns to sing the music into silence.

Instrumentation
A typical performance of the symphony lasts about 35 minutes. It is scored for a large orchestra including: 3 flutes (3rd doubling on piccolo), 2 oboes, cor anglais, 3 clarinets (in B and A; 3rd doubling on bass clarinet), 2 bassoons, 4 horns (in F), 3 trumpets (in C, 1 doubling on natural trumpet in E), 3 trombones, tuba, timpani, triangle, cymbals, bass drum, celesta, harp, and strings, plus a wordless soprano in the 4th movement.

Recordings

Notes

Sources
Howells, Herbert. "Vaughan Williams's 'Pastoral' Symphony". Music & Letters 3, no. 2 (April 1922): 122–132.
Kennedy, Michael. The Works of Ralph Vaughan Williams. London and New York: Oxford University Press, 1964. . New edition, London and New York: Oxford University Press, 1980.  (cloth); . First edition reprinted Oxford: Clarendon Press, 1992. .
Lambert, Constant. Music Ho!. London: Penguin Books, 1948.
Smith, Barry. Peter Warlock: The Life of Philip Heseltine. Oxford: Clarendon Press, 1994. .
Vaughan Williams, Ralph. Letters of Ralph Vaughan Williams 1895–1958, edited by Hugh Cobbe. Oxford: Oxford University Press, 2008.  (cloth);  (pbk).

Further reading
Blom, Eric (December 1931). "Vaughan Williams - Pastoral Symphony." The Music Teacher, vol. 10, no. 12, pp. 666, 674. 
Grimley, Daniel M. (2010). "Landscape and Distance: Vaughan Williams, Modernism and the Symphonic Pastoral." In Matthew Riley, ed., British Music and Modernism, 1895-1960 (Ashgate, 2010), pp. 147–174. 
Manning, David (June 2006). "Listening to the 'Pastoral Symphony.'" Journal of the RVW Society, no. 36, pp. 3–5. 
Ottaway, D. Hugh (November 1949). "Vaughan Williams and the Pastoral Symphony." The Musical Times, vol. 90, no. 1281, p. 404. 
Ottaway, D. Hugh (December 1951). "Vaughan Williams' 'Pastoral Symphony.'" Hallé Magazine, no. 43, pp. 4–7. 
Vaillancourt, Michael (1991). "Modal and Thematic Coherence in Vaughan Williams's 'Pastoral Symphony.'" The Music Review, vol. 52, pp. 203–217.

External links
 

Symphonies by Ralph Vaughan Williams
1922 compositions